Wyoming Highway 71 (WYO 71) is a  north–south Wyoming state highway known as Sage Creek Road in Carbon County that travels from near the Teton Reservoir north into the southern part of Rawlins.

Route description
Highway 71,  predominantly south of Rawlins, travels from Carbon County Route 401 near the Teton Reservoir area north to Rawlins. Upon entering the Rawlins city limits, and after passing under Interstate 80/U.S. Route 30, WYO 71 heads in a more east-west direction paralleling the interstate. Downtown Rawlins can be accessed via Jackson and Washington Streets Highway 71 comes to its northern end at Wyoming Highway 78 just  from exit 214 of I-80/US 30.

Carbon County Route 401 continues south from WYO 71 to the Medicine Bow National Forest boundary where the designation for the roadway changes to Forest Service Road 801 till its end at Wyoming Highway 70. The road is dirt and gravel for the entire county and forest service portion.

Major intersections

References

Official 2003 State Highway Map of Wyoming

External links 

Wyoming State Routes 000-099
WYO 71 - WYO 78 to Carbon CR 401
City of Rawlins website

Transportation in Carbon County, Wyoming
071